Tiphaine is a Francophone surname. Notable people with the name include:

 Bernard Tiphaine (1938–2021), French actor

See also
 Tiphaine (given name)
 Tiffany (disambiguation)
 Typhaine case, a 2009 infanticide in France